Saint Ermin of Lobbes (died 737, in Lobbes, Hainaut, Belgium) was the second abbot of Lobbes Abbey.

Life and legend 
Originally from the region of Laon, he studied at the Cathedral School of Laon (France) and was ordained as a priest by the bishop, Madalgaire.

After entering the Benedictine monastery of Lobbes, he became a disciple of Saint Ursmar. After nomination by Ursmar, he was elected as his successor as the head of the abbey, founded by Saint Landelin. He had a reputation for wisdom and sanctity. His biographer, abbot Anson of Lobbes (+800), stated that he also had a gift for prophecy.

He died in Lobbes in 737, and is interred in a sarcophagus in the crypt of Saint Ursmar's Church in Lobbes. He was succeeded as abbot by Theodwin.

Feast day 
Saint Ermin (Latin: Erminus) is celebrated locally as a Christian saint. His feast day is on 25 April.

Bibliography 
 A Vita Ermini was written by Abbot Anson of Lobbes between 750 and 768. This biography was published in the Acta Sanctorum by the Bollandists (April, vol. III).

External links 
 A. Dimier, L'Abbaye de Vauclair et le Prieuré Saint-Erme on the site of the Federation of Historical and Archeological Societies of Aisne.

Notes and references 

737 deaths
Belgian Roman Catholic saints
Year of birth unknown
Abbots of Lobbes